Dominic Thiem was the defending champion, but chose to compete in the Laver Cup instead.

Daniil Medvedev won the title, defeating Borna Ćorić in the final, 6–3, 6–1. Medvedev became the first active player outside the Big Four to reach the final in five consecutive tournaments.

Seeds
The top four seeds receive a bye into the second round.

Draw

Finals

Top half

Bottom half

Qualifying

Seeds

Qualifiers

Lucky losers

Qualifying draw

First qualifier

Second qualifier

Third qualifier

Fourth qualifier

References

External links
 Main draw
 Qualifying draw

2019 Singles
2019 ATP Tour